José Ignacio San Román (born 17 August 1988) is an Argentine football defender currently playing for San Martín de Mendoza.

Career
Born in San Martín, San Román began his professional playing career in 2006 with River Plate. He made his debut on 10 December 2006 in a 1-1 away draw with Vélez Sarsfield.

After only one game for River Plate, San Roman joined newly promoted Tigre in 2007. He made his first appearance for Tigre on 1 March 2007 in a 1-2 away win against Colón de Santa Fe. With Tigre, San Román achieved the two highest finishes in the history of the club, finishing 2nd in the Apertura 2007 championship and in joint first place in Apertura 2008 championship where they lost the three-way playoff final on goal difference. In 2009 San Román made his first appearances in an international club competition playing two games in Copa Sudamericana.

In 2010, San Román's rights were bought by a third party that loaned him to San Lorenzo for two seasons.

On 15 January 2022, San Román moved to Italy to join Serie D club Lavello. In July 2022 he moved back to Argentina in order to join hometown club San Martín de Mendoza.

References

External links
 
 
 Argentine Primera statistics at Futbol XXI 

1988 births
Living people
Sportspeople from Mendoza Province
Argentine footballers
Association football defenders
Club Atlético River Plate footballers
Club Atlético Tigre footballers
San Lorenzo de Almagro footballers
Real Zaragoza B players
Godoy Cruz Antonio Tomba footballers
Arsenal de Sarandí footballers
Newell's Old Boys footballers
ADO Den Haag players
Nea Salamis Famagusta FC players
Argentine Primera División players
Cypriot First Division players
Argentine expatriate footballers
Expatriate footballers in Spain
Expatriate footballers in Cyprus